The drum tower is an important building in Han Chinese Buddhist temples. Together with a bell tower, they are usually placed on both sides of the Hall of Four Heavenly Kings. It is usually located on the right side while the bell tower is usually located on the left side. It is general a three-storey pavilion with a big drum placed on it. When it is beaten, it sounds grandly and loudly.  Buddhist temples set times to beat the drums to inform the time and also wake people up.

The are found in China and other countries of the region.

References

Bibliography

Further reading

 
 

Chinese Buddhist architecture